Sarbhana is one of the 51 union councils of Abbottabad District in Khyber-Pakhtunkhwa province of Pakistan.

Location 
Sarbhana is located in the west of the district, it is bounded by the following Union Councils, to the north by Kakul, Kuthwal and Beerangali, to the east by  Phalkot, to the south by Namli Maira, Bagnotar and Bagh, and to the west by Dhamtour (Sungli Narrian village).

Subdivisions
The Union Council is subdivided into the following areas: Aziz Bang, Dessal, Khan, Sadra, Dharia, Sarbhana, Seergah, Mohar Khurd and Narian, Sungli.

References

Union councils of Abbottabad District